R. Gundu Rao was the Council of Ministers in Karnataka, a state in South India headed by R. Gundu Rao of the Indian National Congress (Indira).

The ministry had multiple  ministers including the Chief Minister. All ministers belonged to the Indian National Congress (Indira).

R. Gundu Rao became Chief minister of Karnataka after the collapse of the Urs government.

His cabinet has a unique record to hold a cabinet meeting outside the capital for the first time in the state's then 25-year-long history. R. Gundu Rao along with his 14 cabinet ministers travelled to distant Belgaum, 515 km from Bangalore, the Cabinet Meeting went on to make a record 42 decisions in three hours sanctioning schemes worth more than Rs 60 crore. The subjects dealt with ranged from water supply, power and irrigation projects to the construction of two wards in a hospital in Karwar district. While Rao claimed that each one of the decisions was "major", opposition leaders dubbed his entourage as a "'touring circus". Bharatiya Janata Party (BJP) leader A. K. Subbiah and Azeez Sait, a former minister and Indian Congress (Socialist) leader had expressed a concern that those kind of Meetings will be a burden on Tax payer's money and Rao was indulging in cheap publicity.

Chief Minister & Cabinet Ministers

Minister of State

See also
 Karnataka Legislative Assembly

References

Cabinets established in 1980
1980 establishments in Karnataka
1983 disestablishments in India
Gundu Rao
Indian National Congress state ministries
Cabinets disestablished in 1983
1980 in Indian politics